El Pino may refer to:

Natural features 
 El Pino (The Pine Tree), a natural landmark in Los Angeles
 El Pino Lake, a lake in Guatemala

Populated places 
 El Pino, Dominican Republic, a community in the Dominican Republic
 El Pino (Aller), a village in Asturias, Spain
 El Pino de Tormes, a village in Salamanca, Spain
 El Pino Parque Historic District, an historic district in Dayton Beach, Florida

Other uses 
 El Pino & the Volunteers, a band from the Netherlands